As a result of the Merchant Marine Act of 1920, only ships built and registered in the United States are permitted to sail solely between ports in the United States. The Merchant Marine Act of 1928 would continue to incentivize  and spur the construction of U.S. built ships through government loans, which would lead the International Mercantile Marine Company and along with other U.S. run shipping lines to order new ships through up through World War II.

The largest passenger liner built in the United States to date is the SS United States, completed in 1952. The last large passenger liner to be completed in the United States was Moore-McCormack Lines' SS Argentina in 1958.

The only US-built deep water passenger ships still in existence today are the SS United States (laid up), former converted cargo liner SS Medina (hotel ship), cargo/passenger liner NS Savannah (museum ship), and the partially US-built Pride of America (still in service). Today, only small coastal and river passenger ships are still built in the U.S. and fly the American flag.

Shipyards 
The primary yards that were building passenger ships in the 20th century include:

 Newport News Shipbuilding & Drydock Co., Ltd., Newport News, Virginia
 Ingalls Shipyards, Pascagoula, Mississippi
 Fore River Shipyard, Bethlehem Shipbuilding Corporation, Quincy, Massachusetts
 William Cramp & Sons, Philadelphia, Pennsylvania
 New York Shipbuilding of Camden, New Jersey
 Federal Shipbuilding and Dry Dock Company, Kearny, NJ

List

References

External links 
 U.S. Maritime Administration (MARAD) Vessel History Database
 Murals on the High Seas - Artwork on American Built Passenger Liners
 Moore-McCormack Lines History
 Matson Line History
 SS United States Conservancy
 Grace Line History

Bibliography 

United States
Ocean liners, 20th century